(born November 4, 1942) is a female Japanese former volleyball player who competed in the 1968 Summer Olympics.

She was born in Aichi Prefecture.

In 1968 she was part of the Japanese team which won the silver medal in the Olympic tournament. She played six matches.

External links
 profile

1942 births
Living people
Japanese women's volleyball players
Olympic volleyball players of Japan
Volleyball players at the 1968 Summer Olympics
Olympic silver medalists for Japan
Olympic medalists in volleyball
Asian Games medalists in volleyball
Volleyball players at the 1962 Asian Games
Medalists at the 1968 Summer Olympics
Medalists at the 1962 Asian Games
Asian Games gold medalists for Japan